Alamathikkadu is a village in the Pattukkottai taluk of Thanjavur district, Tamil Nadu, India.

Demographics 

As per the 2001 census, Alamathikkadu had a total population of 651 with 310 males and 341 females. The sex ratio was 1100. The literacy rate was 70.27.

References 

 

Villages in Thanjavur district